Sexual attraction to transgender people has been the subject of scientific study and social commentary. Psychologists have researched sexual attraction toward trans women, cross dressers, non-binary people, and a combination of these. Publications in the field of transgender studies have investigated the attraction transgender individuals can feel for each other. The people who feel this attraction to transgender people name their attraction in different ways. Cisgender men attracted to transgender women primarily identify as heterosexual and sometimes as bisexual, but rarely as homosexual, and may even regard their attraction as its sexual orientation and invent their own terms for it. Transgender individuals often call their attraction to other transgender people T4T and may consider it both a sexual identity and a form of political identity.

Cisgender attraction to transgender people

Scientific study 
Despite being referred to as a paraphilia by several researchers, having a sexual preference for transgender people is neither diagnosable as a mental illness nor as a paraphilic disorder.

In their sociological study, Martin S. Weinberg and Colin J. Williams interviewed 26 men sexually interested in transwomen (MSTW). 13 identified themselves as heterosexual, and 13 as "bisexual or probably bisexual". The authors opined "These labels only superficially describe their sexual interest," and noted that the expressed interest in trans women was sometimes used as a basis for denying a more stigmatized self-identity. As an example, they described a case who "said that he was 'bisexual' rather than 'gay' because he was able to think of the transwomen as women".

As part of HIV prevention research in 2004, Operario et al. interviewed 46 men in the San Francisco area who had sex with transgender women, but found "no consistent patterns between how men described their sexual orientation identity versus their sexual behavior and attraction to transgender women". Of the sample, 20 of them described themselves as being straight or heterosexual. Some men were definitive about this declaration, while others were hesitant and wondered if they should consider themselves bisexual.

A Northwestern University study recruited 205 men interested in trans women. In that online survey, 51% identified as straight, 41% as bisexual, and the remainder as gay. Also, 55% said their ideal partner would be a cisgender female, and 36% said it would be a trans woman. The study authors concluded that "The interest in trans women appears to be a distinct sexual interest separate from heterosexual men's attraction to women for the majority of men, but there is a substantial minority who may experience it as their sexual orientation."

A 2016 study that used the penile plethysmograph demonstrated that the arousal patterns, genital and subjective, of men who report attraction to transgender women who have "female-typical physical characteristics (e.g. breasts) while retaining a penis" are similar to those of straight men and different from those of gay men. The study showed that these men are much more aroused to female than to male stimuli. They differed from both the groups of straight and gay men, however, in also displaying strong arousal to stimuli featuring trans women, to which they responded as much as to the cisgender female stimuli. Of the men attracted to trans women, 41.7% identified as bisexual, with the remainder identifying as straight. The bisexuals among them did not display significantly more arousal to male stimuli than their heterosexual counterparts, though they did report a higher number of male sex partners.

A 2019 study that asked 958 participants which gender identities they would be interested in dating found that 96.7% of heterosexual men, 98.2% of heterosexual women, 88.5% of gay men, 71.2% of lesbian women, and 48.3% of bisexual, queer, and non-binary participants reported that they would not be interested in dating a transgender person, and the remainder would be interested.

Social views 
Erotic materials created for people attracted to trans men have become more visible, especially due to pornographic actor Buck Angel. Trans activist Jamison Green writes that cisgender gay men who are partnered with trans men "are often surprised to find that a penis is not what defines a man, that the lack of a penis does not mean a lack of masculinity, manliness, or male sexuality". Gay author Andrew Sullivan has criticized the idea that gay men should necessarily be attracted to trans men, arguing that sexual orientation is based on biological sex, not gender identity.

Terminology 
A variety of casual terms have developed to refer to people who are attracted to transgender people. These terms include trans-attracted, trans-oriented, transfan, trans admirer, and trans catcher. The terms transromantic, transamorous and transsensual have also emerged, but have not seen much usage.

The terms tranny chaser (sometimes shortened to chaser) and tranny hawk have been used, although tranny is considered a slur by many. The term chaser is predominantly used to describe men sexually interested in trans women, but it is sometimes used to refer to those interested in trans men as well. Transgender people themselves often use the term in a pejorative sense, because they consider chasers to value them for their trans status alone, rather than being attracted to them as a person. However, some claim this term in an affirming manner. Sociologist Avery Tompkins of Transylvania University in Kentucky argued in an article in the Journal of Homosexuality that a sex-positive trans politics cannot emerge if terms such as "tranny chaser" informed discussion of attraction to transgender people.

In scientific literature, the terms gynandromorphophilic (noun: gynandromorphophilia) and gynemimetophilic (noun: gynemimetophilia) are used for men who are attracted to trans women who possess a combination of male and female physical characteristics, while andromimetophilic (noun: andromimetophilia) are their counterparts.

The terms skoliosexual and ceterosexual have been used to describe attraction to non-binary people. The terms pansexual and polysexual (as well as bisexual) may be used to indicate that gender variant people are among the types of people to which one is attracted.

T4T attraction 
Transgender people may experience sexual and romantic attraction to other transgender people. This attraction is sometimes called T4T ("trans for trans") or T4T attraction. The word T4T comes from Craigslist personals and forums transgender people used to find other transgender people to date and have sex with.

There are a variety of reasons why transgender people might date, even prefer to date, other transgender people. Some transgender people prefer dating and having sex with other transgender people because of the violence they fear they might experience from cisgender people. Others feel that dating and having sex with other transgender people allows them the emotional safety and the freedom to explore themselves sexually without others questioning the authenticity of their gender. Others may simply find other transgender people more attractive than cisgender people.

T4T, however, is, for some, not just a preference or a type of attraction. Amira Lundy-Harris, Aren Aizura, and Rachel Anne William also regard T4T political identity as a form of separatism focused on advocating for transgender people in the face of a society that discriminates against them.

See also
 List of transgender-related topics
 Transgender pornography

References

Further reading
 Tracie O'Keefe, Katrina Fox, eds., Trans People in Love, Routledge, 2008, 

Sexual fetishism
Sexual attraction
Transgender
Transgender sexuality